James Bryan Whitfield (November 8, 1860 – August 20, 1948) was an American attorney and politician who served as a long-time Justice of the Florida Supreme Court.

Early life and education 
Whitfield was born on November 8, 1860 on his father's plantation in Wayne County, North Carolina. He was a member of the Whitfield family, a prominent planter family in the American South. In 1863, Whitfield and his father moved to their plantation in Leon County, Florida.

Whitfield later moved to the nearby city of Tallahassee, Florida, where he studied law at the West Florida Seminary, later attending the University of Virginia receiving his Bachelor of Laws degree in 1886. He was admitted into the Florida Bar later that year.

Political career 

In 1888, Whitfield, a bank teller at the time, became the personal secretary of Florida Governor Edward A. Perry. The following year, he was appointed Clerk of the Florida Supreme Court. Whitfield, a Democrat, served in this position until June 19, 1897, when he was appointed Florida State Treasurer, succeeding Clarence B. Collins, who had resigned following his impeachment in the Florida House of Representatives for mismanaging state funds.

Whitfield served as State Treasurer until March 1903, when he was appointed Florida Attorney General following the election of the incumbent, William Bailey Lamar, to the U.S. House of Representatives.

Florida Supreme Court 
In February 1904, Whitfield was appointed to the Florida Supreme Court by Governor William Sherman Jennings. Whitfield served on the court until his retirement on January 4, 1943, making him the second-longest serving Florida Supreme Court justice, only behind William Glenn Terrell. Additionally, Whitfield was elected Chief Justice by the court three times, serving in that role from January 1905 until June 1905, 1909 until 1913, and 1935 until 1937.

Whitfield's tenure on the court was marked by a period of great uncertainty regarding the rights of African Americans in Florida. Whitfield himself did not have an opinion on the topic as a whole, rather regarding it on a case-by-case basis, often leading to conflicting opinions. For example, Whitfield wrote the majority opinion for Montgomery v. State (1908), in which he wrote that it is unlawful to exclude black jurors from trials. On the other hand, however, he reaffirmed racial segregation in Florida East Coast Ry. Co. v. Geiger (1913), which upheld separate but equal, and Parramore v. State (1921), which upheld a ban on mixed-race marriages.

Whitfield retired from the court on January 4, 1943, due to declining health.

Personal life 
Whitfield married Leila Nash on November 25, 1886. Nash died from complications following the birth of their first child, John Nash, in 1897. Whitfield later married Margaret Hayward Randolph on June 12, 1901. They had five children together, Mary Croom, James Bryan Jr., Julia, Margaret, and Randolph.

Death and legacy 
Whitfield died on August 20, 1948 at his home in Tallahassee, Florida. He is buried in Tallahassee's Saint Johns Episcopal Church Cemetery.

In 1945, Whitfield received an honorary Doctor of Laws degree from the University of Florida. The University of Florida also has a scholarship in his memory, the Judge James Bryan Whitfield Constitutional Law Scholarship.

References

External links
 

People from Wayne County, North Carolina
Justices of the Florida Supreme Court
State Treasurers of Florida
Florida Attorneys General
1860 births
1948 deaths
Whitfield family
People from Tallahassee, Florida
Florida State University alumni
University of Virginia School of Law alumni
Florida Democrats